In Greek mythology, Lycaon (/laɪˈkeɪɒn/; Ancient Greek: Λυκάων) was the name of the following personages:

 Lycaon or Lycon, son of the giant Aezeius, one of the first Peloponnesian kings, by a nymph. He was the father of Deianira, mother of the impious Lycaon below.
 Lycaon, king of Arcadia and son of Pelasgus. He is the Lycaon who tried to feed Zeus human flesh; in some myths he is turned into a wolf as a result. 
Lycaon, son of Ares and possibly Pelopia or Pyrene, and thus, the brother of Cycnus. Like his brother, he was also killed by Heracles in one of his adventures.
Lycaon, also called Lycus, son of Poseidon and the Pleiad Celaeno. He was the brother of King Eurypylus of Cyrene.
Lycaon, son of the above Eurypylus and Sterope, daughter of Helios, and thus, brother of Leucippus.
 Lycaon, a Trojan prince and son of Priam and Laothoe. He lent his cuirass to Paris when he duelled against Menelaus. On another occasion Apollo took the shape of Lycaon to address Aeneas. During the third year of the war, Lycaon was captured and eventually killed by Achilles.
Lycaon, one of the comrades of the Greek hero Odysseus. When the latter and 12 of his crew came into the port of Sicily, the Cyclops Polyphemus seized and confined them. Along with the Ithacan king and six others namely: Amphialos, Alkimos, Amphidamas, Antilochus and Eurylochos, Lycaon survived the manslaughter of his six companions by the monster.
 Lycaon, father of Pandarus and Eurytion, a companion of Aeneas in Italy. He was a resident of Zeleia in Lycia and together with his son, Lycaon responded to the call of King Priam in Troy when the city was attacked by a large army of the Greeks.
Lycaon of Gnossos, one who fashioned the sword that Ascanius, son of Aeneas, gave to Euryalus.
 Lycaon, father of Erichaetes, one of the soldiers of Aeneas in Italy.

Notes

References 

 Apollodorus, The Library with an English Translation by Sir James George Frazer, F.B.A., F.R.S. in 2 Volumes, Cambridge, MA, Harvard University Press; London, William Heinemann Ltd. 1921. ISBN 0-674-99135-4. Online version at the Perseus Digital Library. Greek text available from the same website.
Dionysus of Halicarnassus, Roman Antiquities. English translation by Earnest Cary in the Loeb Classical Library, 7 volumes. Harvard University Press, 1937–1950. Online version at Bill Thayer's Web Site
 Dionysius of Halicarnassus, Antiquitatum Romanarum quae supersunt, Vol I-IV. . Karl Jacoby. In Aedibus B.G. Teubneri. Leipzig. 1885. Greek text available at the Perseus Digital Library.
 Publius Vergilius Maro, Aeneid. Theodore C. Williams. trans. Boston. Houghton Mifflin Co. 1910. Online version at the Perseus Digital Library.
 Publius Vergilius Maro, Bucolics, Aeneid, and Georgics. J. B. Greenough. Boston. Ginn & Co. 1900. Latin text available at the Perseus Digital Library.
Tzetzes, John, Allegories of the Odyssey translated by Goldwyn, Adam J. and Kokkini, Dimitra. Dumbarton Oaks Medieval Library, Harvard University Press, 2015. 

Children of Poseidon
Princes in Greek mythology